Resistance mutations are mutations producing a resistant phenotype. These include:

 
 
 Resistance mutation (virology)

See also
 Resistance gene (disambiguation)